1998 Malta Open is a darts tournament, which took place in Malta in 1998.

Results

References

1998 in darts
1998 in Maltese sport
Darts in Malta